Dorgeli (Durgeli) is a rural locality (a selo) in Karabudakhkentsky District, Republic of Dagestan, Russia. The population was 5,783 as of 2010. There are 24 streets.

Geography 
Dorgeli is located 30 km southwest of Karabudakhkent (the district's administrative centre) by road. Chankurbe and Chabanmakhi are the nearest rural localities.

Nationalities 
Kumyks live there.

Famous residents 
 Nazir Magomedgadzhiyev (scholar-theologian)
 Magomed-Sultan Magomedov (founder and president of the football club "Anji" (Makhachkala), deputy of the People's Assembly of the Republic of Dagestan)

References 

Rural localities in Karabudakhkentsky District